Opisthoteuthis californiana, also known as the flapjack octopus or adorabilis, is a species of umbrella octopus.

Description 
The flapjack octopus usually appear pinkish. They have fins above their eyes, similar to those found on some species of squid. Their maximum size is  mantle length. They have eight jointed legs which are affixed together in an umbrella shape. They have a gelatinous body, which spreads into a parachute shape when maneuvering through dimly lit water. They swim by moving their fins, pulsing their webbed arms, pushing water through their funnel for jet propulsion, or all three at once.

Distribution
Opisthoteuthis californiana has a distribution in the northern and northeastern Pacific, ranging in the west from off central Honshū (Japan) and the Sea of Okhotsk, its northernmost range is the Bering Sea, and its eastern range is along the western coast of North America as far south as Eureka Bar, California (the type locality, at 350 m depth). The depth at which the species occurs typically ranges from 124 m to 823, however, more recent records indicate that they may occur down to 1500 m depth.

Reproduction 
Opisthoteuthis (like other cirrate octopuses) use 'continuous spawning' where the female lays one or two large eggs at a time over several years (rather than a large batch near the end of the lifespan). These eggs have a hard protective outer shell (unlike the eggs of incirrate octopus) and are not brooded or protected by the mother, the hatched young undergo direct development (lacking the paralarvae stage of incirrate octopus) and are likely benthic. 

Mature Opisthoteuthis californiana females carry approximately 1400–2381 eggs in the ovary, with the individually spawned mature eggs measuring 11 mm long. Estimations of egg hatching time (using water temperature and egg size) for O. californiana are up to 1.4 years at 4°C.

Mating has never been observed in Opisthoteuthis, the males lack the hectocotylus of typical octopus, instead having a series of enlarged suckers that presumably have a role in mating or competition. Males move seasonally, and occur in shallower waters during the summer.

Classification
Opisthoteuthis californiana is one of 14 species in the genus Opisthoteuthis, these species are also collectively known as the flapjack devilfishes (due to the anterior-posterior compression of the body). Opisthoteuthis californiana is morphologically very similar to Opisthoteuthis albatrossi and they may be the same species, but the two have never been critically compared (due to the latter being historically placed in the genus Stauroteuthis). If they are conspecific, O. californiana would be a synonym of O. albatrossi (as the latter was described first in 1920, the former in 1949). Another undescribed Opisthoteuthis may occur in the north-east Pacific, overlapping the distribution of O. californiana, this species is still being described but in media was given the name 'Opisthoteuthis adorabilis' (but this is not yet a valid scientific binomial name as it lacks a published description).

Diet 
The stomach contents of eight Opisthoteuthis californiana were found to contain small benthic/epibenthic crustaceans including copepods, isopods, mysids, and small shrimp (crangonid or hippolytid). From observations of other Opisthoteuthis species, the extensive arm webbing is possibly used to trap small crustaceans, with the cirri and suckers moving small prey items towards the mouth (a fairly low energy feeding strategy compared to shallow water octopus).

In popular culture
In the Finding Nemo franchise, one of Nemo's classmates, Pearl, is a flapjack octopus. Lenny the flapjack octopus is the main character in a children's book The Adventures of a Flapjack Octopus. Flapjack octopodes also appear in ABZU along the sea floor.

Currently 
Currently, in Monterey Canyon, there is an ongoing research with scientists from MBARI (Monterey Bay Aquarium Research Institute), with several O. adorabilis (including a fertile octopus). Unfortunately due to a new environment that mimicked the deep sea, some of the octopuses died living only for a few months. But there is hope as some of the eggs from the octopus has been incubating for a year (in 2015) and there is hope that they will hatch.

References

External links

Photo of a Flapjack Octopus taken at 400 m depth.

Cephalopods of Oceania
Molluscs of the Pacific Ocean
Marine molluscs of Asia
Molluscs of North America
Molluscs of Japan
Western North American coastal fauna
Fauna of California
Molluscs described in 1949